The 2019 ABA League Supercup was the 3rd tournament of the ABA League Supercup, featuring teams from the Adriatic League First Division.

Qualified teams
Based on the results in the 2018–19 ABA League First Division season and the 2018–19 ABA League Second Division Champion there are 8 participants at the 2019 Adriatic Supercup. Qualified teams are the seven best placed teams of the First Division season and the Second Division Champion.

Venue

Bracket
Source: ABA League

Quarterfinals

Partizan NIS v Mega Bemax

Crvena zvezda mts v Koper Primorska

Cedevita Olimpija v FMP

Budućnost VOLI v Cibona

Semifinals

Partizan NIS v Koper Primorska

Budućnost VOLI v Cedevita Olimpija

Final

See also 
 2019–20 ABA League First Division
 2019–20 KK Cedevita Olimpija season
 2019–20 KK Crvena zvezda season
 2019–20 KK Partizan season

Notes

References

External links 
 Official website

Supercup 2019
2019–20 in Croatian basketball
2019–20 in Montenegrin basketball
2019–20 in Serbian basketball
2019–20 in Slovenian basketball
Adriatic
International basketball competitions hosted by Croatia